The Meadowlands Grand Prix was a CART IndyCar race held at the Meadowlands Sports Complex in East Rutherford, New Jersey from 1984 until 1991.  The event was the first major auto race in the New York City metropolitan area since the 1937 Vanderbilt Cup, and came with high expectations, including the potential of rivaling the Indianapolis 500 in stature, and crowds of up to 60,000.

After only eight years, and two separate course layouts, the event proved to be unpopular and a money-loser. Both course layouts were criticized, and the event is generally regarded as one of the worst CART races in the series' history. Despite its negative legacy, the event holds some distinctions, including a notable late-race duel between Al Unser Jr. and Emerson Fittipaldi in 1988, and in 1989 the milestone final victory for the Cosworth DFX/DFS.

History
In 1982, Formula One announced a race in the New York City area for the 1983 season.  However, the race, which was to take place in Flushing Meadows-Corona Park, was first postponed, then canceled.  At the same time, CART and the Meadowlands Sports Complex in East Rutherford, New Jersey, with the help of Long Beach promoter Chris Pook, announced a race for the 1984 season.  The race would take place on a 15-turn, temporary road course set up in the parking lots around Giants Stadium.

The inaugural event's purse of $536,000  made it the richest race in CART history apart from Indianapolis.  The race carried high expectations, was televised nationally, and came on the heels of high-profile successes at former Formula One events in Long Beach and Las Vegas. A crowd of 50,000 was expected.  During practice and qualifying, drivers criticized the tight nature of the course. The race began on a damp track, and Mario Andretti led all 100 laps to win. Despite the rainy weather, 34,388 spectators watched the race.

The 1985 event saw better weather and better attendance, but still fell short of expectations.  The organizers signed a 3-year contract to continue the race, but the circuit's parking lot nature, giving neither the park-like setting of a natural terrain road course nor the atmosphere of a downtown street race, began to draw criticism from drivers and journalists. In 1988, officials changed the layout to a  semi-oval layout surrounding Brendan Byrne Arena in an attempt to improve competition and sight lines for spectators, and the race attracted a record 45,025. In addition, new race sponsor Marlboro offered a $1 million bonus for any driver who could win at the Meadowlands, Michigan, and the Marlboro Challenge in Miami in the same season; no driver would ever win the bonus.

Despite the new layout and increasing purses, attendance dipped and the race failed to turn a profit. The promoters considered moving the event to Washington, D. C., Miami, or Englishtown, New Jersey.  The race was eventually scheduled for 1992 on a circuit in Manhattan on the roads surrounding the World Trade Center and West Street.  The race was postponed until 1993 then cancelled due to cost and conflicts between sponsor Marlboro and Mayor David Dinkins' anti-tobacco advertising policies.

Lap records
The fastest official race lap records at the Meadowlands Grand Prix are listed as:

Race winners

ARS/Indy Lights winners

Trans-Am winners

IMSA GT winners

Race notes
1988: Al Unser Jr. and Emerson Fittipaldi battled at the end. The two cars touched and Fittipaldi veered into a bank of tire barriers. Unser Jr. went on to win. The following year at Indy, the two would be involved in another late-race duel.
1989: Bobby Rahal scores his only victory of the 1989 season. It was the lone victory for the "short stroke" Cosworth DFS, and the 153rd and final race win for the Cosworth DFX/DFS in Indy car racing. The race was halted 5 laps early due to heavy rains and standing water on the course. Rahal held off points leader Emerson Fittipaldi for the victory.
1990: Michael Andretti led 105 of the 150 laps en route to victory, in a crash-filled race. Bobby Rahal and Mario Andretti tangled and crashed on lap 41, while contender Arie Luyendyk later stuffed his car into a tire barrier trying to lap Dominic Dobson. Later Luyendyk missed the turn into turn one, and veered off onto an escape road. He infamously had to drive up an exit ramp and into the Giants Stadium parking lot to turn around and return to the race course.
1991: Bobby Rahal snaps a 34-race losing streak and wins his first CART race in nearly two years to the day of his last win (1989 Meadowlands Grand Prix). It would be the final Meadowlands Grand Prix.

Notes

References

 

Champ Car races
Meadowlands Sports Complex
East Rutherford, New Jersey
Motorsport in New Jersey
Recurring sporting events established in 1984
Recurring events disestablished in 1991
1984 establishments in New Jersey
1991 disestablishments in New Jersey